Gabriel Frederick 'Abie' Malan  (18 November 1935 – 23 October 2014) was a South African rugby union player.

Playing career

After completing his schooling in Kenhardt, Malan started his tertiary studies at Stellenbosch University in 1954, where he soon was selected for the university's first team. In 1958 he was selected for the South African Universities to tour France. He made his senior provincial debut for Western Province in 1955 and in 1961 he joined Transvaal.

Malan made his test debut for the Springboks against the touring French team on 16 August 1958 at Ellis Park in Johannesburg. Five years later, he was selected as captain for the first test against Australia on 13 July 1963 at Loftus Versfeld in Pretoria. He also played in twenty six tour matches, scoring two tries, to add to his one test try.

Test history

See also

List of South Africa national rugby union players – Springbok no. 345

References

1935 births
2014 deaths
South African rugby union players
South Africa international rugby union players
Western Province (rugby union) players
Golden Lions players
People from Kai !Garib Local Municipality
Rugby union hookers
Rugby union players from the Northern Cape